The 6th Parliament of Lower Canada was in session from January 29, 1810, to March 1, 1810. Elections to the Legislative Assembly in Lower Canada had been held in October 1809. Lieutenant-governor James Henry Craig dissolved parliament after the assembly declared the seat of judge Pierre-Amable de Bonne vacant. A vote on the resolution which declared judges ineligible to sit in the assembly had been deferred by the Legislative Council until after the next election. All sessions were held at Quebec City.

References

External links 
  Assemblée nationale du Québec (French)
Journals of the House of Assembly of Lower Canada ..., John Neilson (1810)

06
1810 establishments in Lower Canada
1810 disestablishments in Lower Canada